Ana Patricia "Paty" Navidad Lara (born May 20, 1973) is a Mexican actress and singer.

Biography 
Navidad developed an interest in music before acting, mainly influenced by her father, Jesús. She once was quoted as saying that his voice has been her inspiration since she was born. When she was nine years old, she sang to the public for the first time in a school festival, and at fifteen she made her professional debut.

Twitter suspended Navidad's account in January 2021 after she spread false information about the COVID-19 pandemic. In August 2021, her team confirmed she had tested positive for COVID-19 and was hospitalized. By late August, Navidad had recovered enough to return to television.

Career 
Navidad participated in the Señorita Sinaloa (Miss Sinaloa) contest which offered as a grand prize a scholarship to Televisa's renowned youth acting academy, the Centro de Educación Artística.

Actress 

Navidad will star in Lucero Suárez's telenovela: Espuma de Venus

Singer 
Navidad continued her musical career, releasing the album Instantes ("Instances") in 1998 which reached sales of over 100,000, it was awarded gold record. In May 2000 she released her second album entitled "Mexican", rescuing her Mexican roots.

Carnival 
In 2000, Navidad was awarded Queen of the Banda in the Carnival of Mazatlán, Sinaloa for the recording of the disc Don Cruz Lizárraga presenta a Patricia Navidad: Raíces de mi tierra ("Don Cruz Lizárraga presents Patricia Navidad: Roots of my Homeland").

Television

References

External links 

Interview with Raul de Molina

1973 births
Living people
Mexican telenovela actresses
Mexican television actresses
Mexican stage actresses
Actresses from Sinaloa
Singers from Sinaloa
20th-century Mexican actresses
21st-century Mexican actresses
People from Culiacán
21st-century Mexican singers
21st-century Mexican women singers
Women in Latin music